Charbel Iskandar is a Lebanese actor. He has had roles on Lebanese television series such as The Game of Death (لعبة الموت) and Cheri bil Taqseet. He is also a stage actor and has worked in a number of voice-over roles.

Filmography 
 Film

Television

References 
 General
https://web.archive.org/web/20170114213802/http://asrar-mag.com/AsrarPages/Interviews/charbel_iskandar.html
http://www.lebanonfiles.com/news/369932
https://web.archive.org/web/20160816094737/http://www.cheri3elfan.com/archives/25135
http://www.elfann.com/news/show/1017424/شربل-اسكندر-تركت-الجديد-بسبب-عدم-إحترام-المخرج-ريم
http://www.elfann.com/news/show/1009466/خبر-عاجل-جديد-شربل-اسكندر-وميلاد-رزق-ونخبة-الممثلي
http://www.elfann.com/news/show/46683/شربل-اسكندر-وميلاد-رزق-يرد-على-التجريح-محل
http://bisara7a.com/الممثل-شربل-اسكندر-اطالب-الأمير-الولي/
http://dev.aljaras.com/شربل-إسكندر-لحبيبته-إذا-كنتِ-ترفضين-ال/
http://www.khabar3ajel.com/star-news/tv-charity/
http://www.checklebanon.com/content/description/2/13/1709
https://www.imdb.com/name/nm1941638/

 Specific

External links 

1966 births
Living people
Lebanese male actors
Lebanese male voice actors
21st-century Lebanese male actors